Brachychiton populneus, commonly known as the kurrajong, is a small to medium-sized tree found naturally in Australia in a diversity of habitats from wetter coastal districts to semi-arid interiors of Victoria, New South Wales and Queensland. Carrejun and carrejan were the indigenous names of trees in the foothills of the Blue Mountains near Sydney, and the bark was used for twine and fishing lines. The extended trunk is a water storage device for survival in a warm dry climate. The bell-shaped flowers are variable in colour (pale to pink) while the leaves vary considerably in shape. The leaves are either simple and pointed, or may be 3–9 lobed. Saplings grow from a drought and fire resistant tap-rooted tuber.

The kurrajong has multiple uses and was used by many Australian Aboriginal clans and tribes around Australia. The seeds located in a seed pod were often removed, cleaned of the fine hairs within the seed pod, and roasted. Water could be obtained from the tree roots by boring a hole in the trunk and squeezing the wood. There are also records of the seed pods being turned into a children's rattle or toy. The soft spongy wood was used for making shields, and the bark as a fibre. The leaves are also used as emergency fodder for drought-affected animal stock. There are also records of European settlers using the seeds as a coffee supplement by roasting and crushing the seeds.

It has been introduced as an ornamental tree to south-western Australia, South Africa, Louisiana, California, Arizona and Mediterranean countries. In Western Australia it was observed to be an invasive in disturbed areas.

Horticulturists have hybridised the kurrajong with related Brachychiton species, including the Queensland bottle tree (B. rupestris) and Illawarra flame tree (B. acerifolius) to produce new garden ornamentals.

The specific name Brachychiton populneus pertains to a perceived similarity to the Populus genus, i.e. the poplars. Sometimes B. populneus is also known by the names "lacebark kurrajong" and "bottle tree" (USA). However, B. discolor is also referred to as the lacebark kurrajong, and Bottle Tree is a term commonly applied not only to other species of Brachychiton but to members of other genera around the world.

The kurrajong has been recorded as a host plant for the mistletoe species Dendrophthoe glabrescens.

Gallery

References

 Macoboy, S. (1991) What tree is that?,

External links

 Austral Ecology, Invasion of urban bushland
 Note on economic value
 B. populneus, Australian National Botanic Gardens
 Horticultural notes

populneus
Bushfood
Flora of New South Wales
Flora of Victoria (Australia)
Flora of Queensland
Edible nuts and seeds
Ornamental trees
Drought-tolerant trees
Malvales of Australia
Trees of Australia